John St German was a medieval Bishop of Worcester-elect. He was elected on 25 March 1302 but his election was quashed on 17 October 1302 before he was consecrated.

Citations

References

 

Bishops of Worcester
14th-century English Roman Catholic bishops